The Renewal Front (FR) is a Peronist political party in Argentina led by Sergio Massa, who is part of the Frente de Todos.

Massa is a Peronist and said he wants to "build the Peronism of the 21st century."

History
It was in opposition against the ruling Front for Victory faction within the Justicialist Party and therefore considered part of the dissident Peronist wing until 2019.

The Front was founded by Sergio Massa, the mayor of Tigre, in 2013, ahead of the Argentine mid-term elections. Massa was chief of the cabinet under President Cristina Fernández de Kirchner from 2008 to 2009 and member of the Front for Victory, but broke with the Kirchnerist faction and formed his own political movement.

In the October 2013 mid-term election for the Argentine Chamber of Deputies won 43.9% of the votes and 16 of 35 seats in Buenos Aires Province, distancing the Front of Victory by more than 11 percentage points.

The Renewal Front demonstrated against a possible reform of the National Constitution to enable a third consecutive term of the then President Cristina Fernández de Kirchner.

The Renewal Front held Sergio Massa's candidacy for Presidency within the national coalition for United for a New Alternative. Massa triumphs in the intern against José Manuel de la Sota and is a candidate in the 2015 presidential elections, where he obtained third place and failed to enter the ballotage.

In the 2017 legislative elections, it is grouped together with Generation for a National Encounter, led by Margarita Stolbizer, to form the 1 Country front which promoted the Massa formula for senator and Felipe Solá for deputy.

After discrepancies regarding the direction that space should take in October 2018, Felipe Solá with Facundo Moyano, Daniel Arroyo, Fernando Asencio and Jorge Toboada decide to leave the space forming another block in congress and definitively breaking with Sergio Massa.

In 2019, the Renewal Front forms the Frente de Todos supporting the presidential formula Alberto Fernández - Cristina Fernández de Kirchner. The leader of the party, Sergio Massa, ran for the first national deputy candidate for the province of Buenos Aires. Massa became President of the Chamber of Deputies and Mario Meoni became Minister of Transport.

Electoral performance

President

See also 
 United for a New Alternative
 Federal Peronism (Center-right faction of the Justicialist Party)
 Front for Victory (Center-left faction of the Justicialist Party)

References

External links
 Home page 

Justicialist Party
Peronist parties and alliances in Argentina
Political party factions in Argentina
Political parties established in 2013
2013 establishments in Argentina